Harry Crabtree  (30 April 1906 – 28 May 1982) was an English cricketer. He played for Essex between 1931 and 1947.

References

External links

1906 births
1982 deaths
English cricketers
Essex cricketers
People from Barnoldswick
Cricketers from Yorkshire